TDRS-B was an American communications satellite, of first generation, which was to have formed part of the Tracking and Data Relay Satellite System. It was destroyed in 1986 when the  disintegrated 73 seconds after launch.

Launch
TDRS-B was launched in the payload bay of Challenger, attached to an Inertial Upper Stage (IUS). It was to have been deployed from the Shuttle in low Earth orbit. The IUS would have then performed two burns to raise the satellite into a geosynchronous orbit. On the previous TDRS launch, TDRS-1, the IUS second-stage motor malfunctioned following the first-stage burn, resulting in a loss of control, and delivery of the satellite into an incorrect orbit.

Launch failed

TDRS-B was originally scheduled for launch on STS-12 in March 1984; however, it was delayed and the flight cancelled following the IUS failure on TDRS-1. It was later re-manifested on STS-51-E; however, this too was cancelled due to concerns over the reliability of the IUS. It was eventually assigned to STS-51-L, which was also to carry the SPARTAN-Halley astronomy satellite.

STS-51-L launched with TDRS-B at 16:38:00 UTC on 28 January 1986. The Shuttle disintegrated 73 seconds after launch due to an O-ring failure in one of the Solid Rocket Boosters, killing the seven astronauts aboard and destroying TDRS-B.

Aftermath

Once it reached orbit, TDRS-B was to have been given the operational designation TDRS-2. Although normal practice was to reassign operational designations in the event of launch failures, the TDRS-2 designation was not reassigned, and when TDRS-C was launched, it became TDRS-3. Debris from TDRS-B was recovered along with the wreckage of Challenger.

It became TDRS-7 after reaching geosynchronous orbit.

See also 

 List of TDRS satellites

References

Satellite launch failures
Space Shuttle Challenger disaster
Spacecraft launched in 1986
TDRS satellites